Ronny Levy (also spelled Roni; born 14 November 1966) is an Israeli football manager, and a former international football player. Levy played as a defensive midfielder and won championships with both teams Bnei Yehuda and Maccabi Haifa.

Playing career
Levy started his career as a striker in the youth teams of Maccabi Netanya. He was promoted to the first team in 1985. After five seasons, he was loaned to Bnei Yehuda where he won his first championship title.

After returning to Maccabi Netanya, Levy transferred to Maccabi Haifa in 1992 where he was positioned as a defender. After a few games, his role was changed to defensive midfielder, the position he would occupy until the end of his playing career. He retired from playing in 1997 due to a serious injury of his knee.

International career
He has sixteen international caps with the Israeli national team.

As a manager
After retirement, Levy coached one of Maccabi Haifa's youth teams. After two years with the youth academy, he was made the first team's assistant manager, under the management of Eli Cohen. When Cohen resigned, towards the end of the 1999–2000 season, Levy replaced him, managing the last few games of the season. Once the season was over, Levy returned to the youth academy, but this time as head coach of the first youth team. He continued in this role for the next three years.

As the season of 2002–03 ended, and manager Itzhak Shum left the club for the Greek club Panathinaikos, Levy once again became the first team manager. Levy won three domestic championships in a row in his first 3 years of managing Maccabi Haifa (2003–04, 2004–05, 2005–06), one Toto Cup Al (2006), and a qualification to the UEFA cup group stage in 2006–07.

In 2006, Levy received a "manager of the year" award from both major Israeli newspapers, 'Yedioth Ahronoth and Maariv. After seasons 2006–07, 2007–08 which were considered as failure after failing to challenge for the title, finishing 5th in both seasons, he left the club and was replaced by Elisha Levy.

On 22 December, Levy signed with Maccabi Petah Tikva for a year and a half. After less than a year with the Petah Tikva side, Levy quit.

On 31 December 2009, Levy signed a year and a half contract, worth $600,000, to manage Unirea Urziceni. His first game in charge, on 18 February 2010, was against Liverpool at Anfield in the UEFA Europa League, where the visitors lost 1–0.

On 17 January 2011, Levy signed for Beitar Jerusalem.

On 10 June 2011, Steaua Bucharest presented Ronny Levy as the new head coach of the team. He was fired on 30 September 2011 after a draw against AEK Larnaca in the UEFA Europa League. The next day, 1 October, he signed a year contract with Anorthosis Famagusta. He was sacked on 1 April 2013.

On 6 December 2013, Levy made his return to Beitar Jerusalem.

On 14 January 2015, Levy signed with Maccabi Netanya.

On 18 May 2015, Levy returned to Maccabi Haifa, signing a three year contract.

On 26 October 2016, Levy made his return to Anorthosis Famagusta after signing an 18 month contract. He left the club in September 2018.

Honours

As a Player
Israeli Premier League (2):
1989–90, 1993–94
Israel State Cup (2):
1993, 1995
Toto Cup (1):
1993–94

As a Manager
Israeli Youth Championship (1):
2002–03
Youth State Cup (1):
2003
Israeli Premier League (3):
2003–04, 2004–05, 2005–06
Toto Cup (3):
2005–06, 2007–08, 2019
Liga I:
 Runners-up (1): 2009–10
Israel State Cup (1):
2016

References

1966 births
Living people
Israeli Jews
Israeli footballers
Footballers from Netanya
Maccabi Netanya F.C. players
Bnei Yehuda Tel Aviv F.C. players
Maccabi Haifa F.C. players
Israel international footballers
Israeli football managers
Maccabi Haifa F.C. managers
Maccabi Petah Tikva F.C. managers
FC Unirea Urziceni managers
Beitar Jerusalem F.C. managers
FC Steaua București managers
Anorthosis Famagusta F.C. managers
Maccabi Netanya F.C. managers
Hapoel Be'er Sheva F.C. managers
Hapoel Haifa F.C. managers
Israeli Premier League managers
Expatriate football managers in Romania
Israeli expatriate sportspeople in Romania
Expatriate football managers in Cyprus
Israeli expatriate football managers in Cyprus
Association football midfielders